The Merritt Building is a historic building on the corner of Broadway and 8th Street in Downtown Los Angeles, California, U.S.. It was built in 1915 for Hulett C. Merritt, and it was designed in the Neoclassical architectural style by Reid & Red. It is 36.27 meter high, with nine storeys. It was purchased by Bonnis Properties, a Canadian development company, for $24 million in November 2016 and is currently undergoing renovation.

References

Commercial buildings completed in 1915
Buildings and structures in Downtown Los Angeles
Neoclassical architecture in California

Reid & Reid buildings